Jayden, Jadin, Jadyn, Jaiden, Jaden, and (among other variations) are Unisex given names that were rather obscure until the 1990s, when they began to appear on the U.S. Social Security Administration's list of the 1,000 most popular boys' names. A name likely of modern invention, Jayden's rank among boys in the United States was 26 , though it peaked at number 4 in 2011.

Etymology
The name is probably a modern invention, formed by blending the "Jay" sound from the 1970s-popular name Jason with the "den" sound from names like Braden, Hayden, Jordan and Zayden. The biblical name Jadon (or Yadon), Hebrew for "he will judge", appears in the Bible in Nehemiah 3:7, but it is unlikely to be the source of the modern name.

Usage and popularity

The first Jadon to appear in the U.S. Census is Jadon Solomon Jones (born 1858) of South Carolina, among a few others of the same name in the 19th century. The first year the SSA listed the name – those names in its annual list must be given to at least five children – was in 1970, when there were five Jadens born. Jadon appeared in 1973, and Jayden was first listed in 1977.

The name first appeared on the SSA's list of the 1,000 most popular boys' names in 1994, at number 850. It became dramatically more popular among ethnic minorities in the U.S. thereafter with the naming of Jaden Smith (a variant of Jayden; derived from his mother's name, Jada), the son of two famous actors, in 1998: use of the name about doubled between 1998 and 1999.

Australia saw Jayden as a top 100 name in the state of Victoria in 1989. In the United States, a decade later, Jayden rank had risen to 62 and peaked at number 4 in 2011 with 16,979 births. The rank of Jayden  is 26; variants that have peaked are Jaden (at 74 in 2007), Jaiden (at 171 in 2009), Jadyn (at 248 in 2005), Jadan (at 373 in 2003), and Jaidyn (at 559 in 2008).

The name's and variants' sudden rise in U.S. usage comes from many places: J names have been historically liked by Americans, and the popularity of two-syllable names ending in n has increased, as has the frequency of distinctive names.

People

Male
Jayden Antwi-Nyame (born 1998), English footballer
Jayden Attard (born 1986), Australian rules footballer
Jayden Brailey (born 1996), Australian rugby league player
Jayden Gardner (born 2000), American basketball player
Jayden Hadler (born 1993), Australian swimmer
Jayden Hayward (born 1987), New Zealand rugby union player
Jayden Hodges (born 1993), Australian rugby player
Jayden Hunt (born 1995), Australian rules footballer
Jayden Laverde (born 1996), Australian rules footballer
Jayden Levitt (born 1986), South African-born cricketer
Jayden Ngamanu (born 1997), Australian rugby union player
Jayden Nikorima (born 1996), New Zealand-Australian rugby league player
Jayden Panesso, vocalist for American band Sylar
Jayden Peevy (born 1999), American football player
Jayden Pitt (born 1992), Australian rules footballer
Jayden Post (born 1989), Australian rules footballer
Jayden Reed (born 2000), American football player
Jayden Richardson (born 2000), English footballer
Jayden Sawyer (born 1993), Australian Paralympian
Jayden Schofield (born 1992), Australian rules footballer
Jayden Scrubb (born 2000), American basketball player known as Jay Scrubb
Jayden Short (born 1996), Australian rules footballer
Jayden Sierra (born 1994), member of Australian band The Collective
Jayden Stockley (born 1993), English footballer
Jayden Walker (born 1996), Italian rugby league player
Jayden Warn (born 1994), Australian wheelchair rugby player
Jayden X, alias of American political activist John Earle Sullivan (born 1994)
Jayden Yuan (born 1997), Chinese actor and martial artist

Female
Jayden Bartels (born 2004), American social media personality, YouTuber, singer, and actress

Other variants
 Jaiden Animations (b. 1997), American YouTuber
Jadin Bell (1997–2013), American suicide
Jaidon Codrington (born 1984), American boxer
Jadyn Douglas (born 1985), Puerto Rican singer-songwriter
Jaeden Graham (born 1995), American football player
Jaiyden Hunt (born 1998), Australian rugby league footballer 
Jaiden Kaine, Cuban-American actor
Jadon Lavik (born 1978), American singer-songwriter
Jaidyn Leskie (1996–1997), murdered Australian child
Jaeden Martell (born 2003), American actor 
Jadyn Matthews (born 1999), American-born Jamaican footballer 
Jaeden Mercure (born 2003), Canadian soccer player 
Jadon Sancho (born 2000), English footballer
Jadin Watson, Canadian rapper and musician performing as NorthSideBenji
Jadin Wong (1913–2010), American singer
Jadyn Wong, Canadian actress

Fictional characters
Jayden, name given to Data in "Thine Own Self", a 1994 episode of Star Trek: The Next Generation
Jayden Hoyles, in 2019 Netflix series Daybreak
Jayden Hunt, in the British soap opera Doctors
Jayden Johnson, in the 2009 American TV film An American Girl: Chrissa Stands Strong
Jayden Shiba, leader in the TV series Power Rangers Samurai
Jayden Warley, in the Australian soap opera Neighbours
Norman Jayden, an FBI agent from the video game Heavy Rain

See also
Jaden, a given name and surname
Jadin (disambiguation), a surname
Jaidon River, a river in Romania

References

English-language unisex given names
English-language masculine given names
English-language feminine given names
English unisex given names
English masculine given names
English feminine given names